Julia Lee Niebergall (15 February 1886 – 19 October 1968) was a musician and ragtime era composer.

Early life and education

Niebergall was born in Indianapolis, Indiana to a family of musicians. Her father played double-bass, her sister piano, and her brother percussion. Herself a pianist, she played at public events, as an accompanist for silent movies. and for ballet and gym classes. She also taught music at a high school.

Career

She is credited with but six musical compositions, two of which—Hoosier Rag and Red Rambler Rag—achieved popular success.  She was a friend of May Aufderheide, one of the most popular female ragtime composers, who also lived in Indiana, and whose father published several of Niebergall’s compositions.

Niebergall reportedly supported herself as a musician and teacher until her death.

Compositions 
 Clothilda (1905)
 Hoosier Rag (1907)
 Bryan Cocktail (1908)
 When Twilight is Falling (1909)
 Horseshoe Rag (1911)
 Red Rambler Rag (1912)

References

External links 
 Hoosier Rag, played by John Remmers
 Red Rambler Rag, played by Jack Bradshaw
 Horseshoe Rag, played by Nora Hulse
 Red Rambler Rag sheet music
 Hoosier Rag sheet music
 Horseshoe Rag sheet music
 Clothilda sheet music

1886 births
1968 deaths
American ragtime musicians
Ragtime composers
20th-century American women musicians